Bushy lippia is a common name for several plants and may refer to:

Lippia alba
Phyla dulcis